Texas Heart is a 2016 American drama film directed by Mark David, starring Erik Fellows, Kam Dabrowski, Daniela Bobadilla and Lin Shaye.

Cast
 Erik Fellows as Peter
 Kam Dabrowski as Tiger
 Daniela Bobadilla as Alison
 Lin Shaye as Mrs. Smith
 Johnny Dowers as Sheriff Dobbs
 John Savage as Carl
 Jared Abrahamson as Roy

Reception
Gary Goldstein of the Los Angeles Times wrote that "The various story strands come crashing together in ways that are both beyond belief and strangely satisfying."

Sebastian Zavala Kahn of ScreenAnarchy wrote that "Despite trying to do two completely different things at the same time, “Texas Heart” manages to grab the viewer’s attention thanks to its portrayal of a small, Westernish town, and the development of its protagonists."

References

External links
 
 

American drama films
2016 drama films